Winebrenners Crossroad is a small unincorporated community along the Warm Springs Road southeast of Martinsburg in Berkeley County, West Virginia, United States. It is centered on the intersection or "crossroad" of the Warm Springs Road with Van Clevesville Road and Winebrenner Road. The Crossroad area is the site of the 18th century Strayer-Couchman House listed on the National Register of Historic Places.

Unincorporated communities in Berkeley County, West Virginia
Unincorporated communities in West Virginia